Single-minded may refer to:

Psychology 
 Attention or focus
 Attentional control
 Determination
 Open-mindedness, receptivity to new ideas, contrasted with closed-mindedness

Religion 
 Double-mindedness, a concept developed by Søren Kierkegaard from Christian tradition
 Ekaggata, a Buddhist term meaning tranquillity of mind or onepointedness
 James 1, a passage in the Christian Bible discussing double-mindedness